Ronald Lewis Rowan (born April 23, 1962) is a retired American-Irish basketball player. Rowan, a 6'5" 200 lb small forward, played collegiately at the University of Notre Dame and St. John's University.

High school and college career
Born in New Brighton, Pennsylvania, Rowan starred at Beaver Falls (Pennsylvania) High School, averaging nearly 26 points per game as a senior.  In February 1981, he committed to play for the University of Notre Dame, then coached by Digger Phelps.  In January 1983, Phelps suspended Rowan after learning that Rowan was planning to transfer to Penn State.  When Penn State coach Dick Harter left Penn State, Rowan was released from his commitment and later transferred to St. John's University.

In his first season at St. John's, Rowan played in 28 games alongside Chris Mullin, Mark Jackson, Willie Glass, and Bill Wennington, as the team went 31-4.

As a senior during the 1985-86 season at St. John's, Rowan averaged 14 points per game.  Along with Jackson, Walter Berry, and Shelton Jones, Rowan helped St. John's to a 31-5 record.  Rowan currently ranks among St. John's all-time top 10 free-throw percentage leaders (.871).

Professional career
He was selected in the third round of the 1986 NBA Draft by the Philadelphia 76ers but was cut from the team during training camp. He then played in the Continental Basketball Association, earning Rookie of the Year honors in 1987 while a member of the Topeka (Kansas) Sizzlers, where he averaged 18.8 points in 44 games.

In March 1987, he signed a 10-day contract with the Portland Trail Blazers, averaging 1.7 points in seven games.

In 1989, Rowan moved to Italy where he played 11 seasons (5 in A1 division). He changed teams almost every year except when he played three seasons in Kleenex Pistoia (1989–1992), where he scored 3,767 points in 117 matches.

Personal life
Rowan's son Maverick Rowan played college basketball for NC State.

References

External links
NBA & college stats @ basketballreference.com
Italian championship stats @ legabasket.it

1962 births
Living people
American expatriate basketball people in Greece
American expatriate basketball people in Italy
American expatriate basketball people in Spain
American men's basketball players
Baloncesto Fuenlabrada players
Baloncesto León players
Basket Napoli players
Basketball players from Pennsylvania
Cedar Rapids Silver Bullets players
Chicago Rockers players
Irish men's basketball players
Liga ACB players
Mens Sana Basket players
Notre Dame Fighting Irish men's basketball players
Olimpia Basket Pistoia players
Pallacanestro Cantù players
Pallacanestro Reggiana players
Pallacanestro Trapani players
Pallacanestro Trieste players
P.A.O.K. BC players
People from New Brighton, Pennsylvania
Philadelphia 76ers draft picks
Portland Trail Blazers players
Reyer Venezia players
Small forwards
Sportspeople from the Pittsburgh metropolitan area
St. John's Red Storm men's basketball players
Topeka Sizzlers players